Elections to Bolton Metropolitan Borough Council were held on 3 May 2012. One third of the council was up for election, with each successful candidate to serve a four-year term of office, expiring in 2016.

22 seats were contested, including all 3 Bradshaw seats, following the resignation of Conservative married couple, Diane and Paul Brierley. The Labour Party won 14 seats, whilst the Conservatives won 7 seats and the Liberal Democrats 1 seat.

After the election, the composition of the council was as follows:
Labour 41
Conservative 16
Liberal Democrats 3

Election result

Council Composition
Prior to the election the composition of the council was:

After the election the composition of the council was:

L – Liberal Democrats

Ward results

Astley Bridge ward

Bradshaw ward 
All three seats were up for election. Dean stood again for election in 2014, Haslam in 2015, and Hall in 2016.

Breightmet ward

Bromley Cross ward

Crompton ward

Farnworth ward

Great Lever ward

Halliwell ward

Harper Green ward

Heaton and Lostock ward

Horwich and Blackrod ward

Horwich North East ward

Hulton ward

Kearsley ward

Little Lever and Darcy Lever ward

Rumworth ward

Smithills ward

Tonge with the Haulgh ward

Westhoughton North and Chew Moor ward

Westhoughton South ward

References

 
 

2012
2012 English local elections
2010s in Greater Manchester